Lunar Laser Ranging (LLR) is the practice of measuring the distance between the surfaces of the Earth and the Moon using laser ranging. The distance can be calculated from the round-trip time of laser light pulses travelling at the speed of light, which are reflected back to Earth by the Moon's surface or by one of five retroreflectors installed on the Moon during the Apollo program (11, 14, and 15) and Lunokhod 1 and 2 missions.

Although it is possible to reflect light or radio waves directly from the Moon's surface (a process known as EME), a much more precise range measurement can be made using retroreflectors, since because of their small size, the temporal spread in the reflected signal is much smaller.

A review of Lunar Laser Ranging is available.

Laser ranging measurements can also be made with retroreflectors installed on Moon-orbiting satellites such as the LRO.

History

The first successful lunar ranging tests were carried out in 1962 when Louis Smullin and Giorgio Fiocco from the Massachusetts Institute of Technology succeeded in observing laser pulses reflected from the Moon's surface using a laser with a 50J 0.5 millisecond pulse length. Similar measurements were obtained later the same year by a Soviet team at the Crimean Astrophysical Observatory using a Q-switched ruby laser.

Shortly thereafter, Princeton University graduate student James Faller proposed placing optical reflectors on the Moon to improve the accuracy of the measurements. This was achieved following the installation of a retroreflector array on July 21, 1969 by the crew of Apollo 11. Two more retroreflector arrays were left by the Apollo 14 and Apollo 15 missions. Successful lunar laser range measurements to the retroreflectors were first reported on Aug. 1, 1969 by the 3.1 m telescope at Lick Observatory. Observations from Air Force Cambridge Research Laboratories Lunar Ranging Observatory in Arizona, the Pic du Midi Observatory in France, the Tokyo Astronomical Observatory, and McDonald Observatory in Texas soon followed.

The uncrewed Soviet Lunokhod 1 and Lunokhod 2 rovers carried smaller arrays. Reflected signals were initially received from Lunokhod 1 by the Soviet Union up to 1974, but not by western observatories that did not have precise information about location. In 2010 NASA's Lunar Reconnaissance Orbiter located the Lunokhod 1 rover on images and in April 2010 a team from University of California ranged the array. Lunokhod 2 array continues to return signals to Earth. The Lunokhod arrays suffer from decreased performance in direct sunlight—a factor considered in reflector placement during the Apollo missions.

The Apollo 15 array is three times the size of the arrays left by the two earlier Apollo missions. Its size made it the target of three-quarters of the sample measurements taken in the first 25 years of the experiment. Improvements in technology since then have resulted in greater use of the smaller arrays, by sites such as the Côte d'Azur Observatory in Nice, France; and the Apache Point Observatory Lunar Laser-ranging Operation (APOLLO) at the Apache Point Observatory in New Mexico.

In the 2010s several new retroreflectors were planned. The MoonLIGHT reflector, which was to be placed by the private MX-1E lander, was designed to increase measurement accuracy up to 100 times over existing systems. MX-1E was set to launch in July 2020, however, as of February 2020, the launch of the MX-1E has been canceled.

Principle

The distance to the Moon is calculated  using the equation:
. Since the speed of light is a defined constant, conversion between distance and time of flight can be made without ambiguity. 

To compute the lunar distance precisely, many factors must be considered in addition to the round-trip time of about 2.5 seconds. These factors include the location of the Moon in the sky, the relative motion of Earth and the Moon, Earth's rotation, lunar libration, polar motion, weather, speed of light in various parts of air, propagation delay through Earth's atmosphere, the location of the observing station and its motion due to crustal motion and tides, and relativistic effects. The distance continually changes for a number of reasons, but averages  between the center of the Earth and the center of the Moon. The orbits of the Moon and planets are integrated numerically along with the orientation of the Moon called physical Libration. 

The reflected light is too weak to see with the human eye. Out of  photons aimed at the reflector, only one is received back on Earth, even under good conditions. They can be identified as originating from the laser because the laser is highly monochromatic.

As of 2009, the distance to the Moon can be measured with millimeter precision. In a relative sense, this is one of the most precise distance measurements ever made, and is equivalent in accuracy to determining the distance between Los Angeles and New York to within the width of a human hair.

List of retroreflectors

List of observatories 
The table below presents a list of active and inactive Lunar Laser Ranging stations on Earth.

Data analysis 
The Lunar Laser Ranging data is collected in order to extract numerical values for a number of parameters. Analyzing the range data involves dynamics, terrestrial geophysics, and lunar geophysics. The modeling problem involves two aspects: an accurate computation of the lunar orbit and lunar orientation, and an accurate model for the time of flight from an observing station to a retroreflector and back to the station. Modern Lunar Laser Ranging data can be fit with a 1 cm weighted rms residual.

 The center of Earth to center of Moon distance is computed by a program that numerically integrates the lunar and planetary orbits accounting for the gravitational attraction of the Sun, planets, and a selection of asteroids.

 The same program integrates the 3-axis orientation of the Moon called physical Libration. 

The range model includes 

 The position of the ranging station accounting for motion due to plate tectonics, Earth rotation, precession, nutation, and polar motion.

 Tides in the solid Earth and seasonal motion of the solid Earth with respect to its center of mass.
 Relativistic transformation of time and space coordinates from a frame moving with the station to a frame fixed with respect to the solar system center of mass. Lorentz contraction of the Earth is part of this transformation.
 Delay in the Earth’s atmosphere.
 Relativistic delay due to the gravity fields of the Sun, Earth, and Moon.
 The position of the retroreflector accounting for orientation of the Moon and solid-body tides.
 Lorentz contraction of the Moon.
 Thermal expansion and contraction of the retroreflector mounts.

For the terrestrial model, the IERS Conventions (2010) is a source of detailed information.

Results
Lunar laser ranging measurement data is available from the Paris Observatory Lunar Analysis Center, the International Laser Ranging Service archives, and the active stations. Some of the findings of this long-term experiment are:

Properties of the Moon 
 The distance to the Moon can be measured with millimeter precision.
This rate has been described as anomalously high.
The fluid core of the Moon was detected from the effects of core/mantle boundary dissipation.
The Moon has free physical librations that require one or more stimulating mechanisms.  
Tidal dissipation in the Moon depends on tidal frequency.  
 The Moon probably has a liquid core of about 20% of the Moon's radius.
Accurate locations for retroreflectors serve as reference points visible to orbiting spacecraft.

Gravitational physics 
Einstein's theory of gravity (the general theory of relativity) predicts the Moon's orbit to within the accuracy of the laser ranging measurements.
 Gauge freedom plays a major role in a correct physical interpretation of the relativistic effects in the Earth-Moon system observed with LLR technique.
 The likelihood of any Nordtvedt effect (a hypothetical differential acceleration of the Moon and Earth towards the Sun caused by their different degrees of compactness) has been ruled out to high precision, strongly supporting the strong equivalence principle.
 The universal force of gravity is very stable.

Gallery

See also

 Carroll Alley (first principal investigator of the Apollo Lunar Laser Ranging team)
 Lidar
 Lunar distance (astronomy)
 Satellite laser ranging
 Space geodesy
 Third-party evidence for Apollo Moon landings
 List of artificial objects on the Moon

References

External links
 "Theory and Model for the New Generation of the Lunar Laser Ranging Data" by Sergei Kopeikin
 Apollo 15 Experiments - Laser Ranging Retroreflector by the Lunar and Planetary Institute
 "History of Laser Ranging and MLRS" by the University of Texas at Austin, Center for Space Research
 "Lunar Retroreflectors" by Tom Murphy
 Station de Télémétrie Laser-Lune in Grasse, France
 Lunar Laser Ranging from International Laser Ranging Service
 "UW researcher plans project to pin down moon's distance from Earth" by Vince Stricherz, UW Today, 14 January 2002
 "What Neil & Buzz Left on the Moon" by Science@NASA, 20 July 2004
 "Apollo 11 Experiment Still Returning Results" by Robin Lloyd, CNN, 21 July 1999
 "Shooting Lasers at the Moon: Hal Walker and the Lunar Retroreflector" by Smithsonian National Air and Space Museum, YouTube, 20 Aug 2019

Lunar science
Apollo program hardware
Tests of general relativity